Peter Hollander Ridder (1608–1692) was the governor of the Swedish colony of New Sweden from 1640 until 1643.

Peter Hollander Ridder's father was a Dutchman living in Ekenäs, Finland. Peter Hollander Ridder was serving in the Swedish Navy when he was appointed as governor of New Sweden. After a difficult journey he arrived to New Sweden, together with a handful of settlers, on board the Kalmar Nyckel on her second expedition April 17, 1640. Upon arrival Ridder wrote back to Sweden to Admiral Claes Fleming and Chancellor Axel Oxenstierna requesting more colonists and skilled workmen. This request was fulfilled when Kalmar Nyckel and Charitas arrived to the settlement on November 7, 1641 with additional settlers including many Forest Finns.

He purchased more land from Lenape Indians north of modern-day Philadelphia. This parcel was  along the Delaware River between the Falls of the Delaware and Schuylkill River, between what is today Trenton, New Jersey and Morrisville Pennsylvania.  When Johan Björnsson Printz took over as governor of New Sweden, Ridder returned to Sweden to serve in the Swedish Navy. He became a major in 1660 and served as the governor of Vyborg (Swedish: Viborg) in Karelia from 1666 until 1681. Vyborg, the easternmost outpost of the Realm of Sweden, is today  located in Leningrad Oblast, Russia.

References

Other sources
Johnson, Amandus. The Swedish Settlements on the Delaware Volume I, Their History and Relation to the Indians, Dutch and English, 1638-1664 (Philadelphia: The Swedish Colonial Society, 1911)
Johnson, Amandus.  The Swedes in America 1638-1900: Volume I, The Swedes on the Delaware 1638-1664 (Philadelphia: The Swedish Colonial Society, 1914)
Johnson, Amandus. The Swedish Settlements on the Delaware 1638-1664, Volume II (Philadelphia: The Swedish Colonial Society, 1927)
 Weslager, C. A.  New Sweden on the Delaware: 1638-1655  (Wilmington, DE: The Middle Atlantic Press, 1988)

1608 births
1692 deaths
Governors of New Sweden
County governors of Sweden
Swedish military officers
People of New Sweden
American people of Dutch descent
17th-century Swedish politicians
People of colonial New Jersey